Bavil Rural District is in the Central District of Osku County, East Azerbaijan province, Iran. At the National Census of 2006, its population was 23,318 in 6,801 households. There were 9,792 inhabitants in 3,074 households at the following census of 2011. At the most recent census of 2016, the population of the rural district was 9,397 in 3,169 households. The largest of its six villages was Bayram, with 2,982 people.

References 

Osku County

Rural Districts of East Azerbaijan Province

Populated places in East Azerbaijan Province

Populated places in Osku County